La Joya High School is a Texas UIL Division 6A high school in the La Joya Independent School District named after the city it resides in, La Joya.  The school is home to students that live on the west and south areas of La Joya ISD.

La Joya HS serves the cities of La Joya, Peñitas, and Sullivan City, as well as the census-designated places of Abram, Cuevitas, Havana, and Los Ebanos. It also serves parts of the City of Palmview and parts of the census-designated places of Doffing, Palmview South, and Perezville.

History 
La Joya ISD had been home to a single high school entity since the district (then known as Tabasco ISD) erected Nellie Schunior Memorial High School in 1926, six years after the death of Nellie Leo Schunior, the first education pioneer in the district's current boundaries. La Joya High School was later created, in order to house the growing number of students that Nellie Schunior Memorial High School could not accommodate. As the years rapidly passed, the communities within the district boundaries began to flourish, and the district population exploded. For a long time, La Joya High School housed 9-12 grades. Eventually, the student population grew too much and a separate Ninth Grade Campus was built adjacent to La Joya High School. In 1993 over 3,000 students were enrolled at La Joya High School, and enrollment was sharply increasing throughout the La Joya Independent School District.

References

External links 
 

La Joya Independent School District high schools
1941 establishments in Texas